Finding Our Way may refer to:

 Finding Our Way: Rethinking Ecofeminist Politics, a 1991 book by Janet Biehl
 Finding Our Way: Rethinking Ethnocultural Relations in Canada, a 1998 book by  Will Kymlicka
 Finding Our Way, a 2010 documentary by Leonie Sandercock
 Finding Our Way, a 2012 album by Hyland (band)
 "Finding Our Way", a song by Ben Harper & the Innocent Criminals from the 2016 album Call It What It Is